Jeong Na-eun (Hangul: 정나은; born 27 June 2000) is a South Korean badminton player affiliated with Hwasun County team. In her junior, she won a bronze medal at the 2018 World Junior Championships and a silver at the Asian Junior Championships with her partner Wang Chan.

Career 
Partnered with Kim Hye-jeong, they reached the finals of the Indonesia Masters in 2021 but lost to Nami Matsuyama and Chiharu Shida of Japan.

In 2022, they were semifinalists at the All England Open. Months later, they would go onto win the Korea Open by beating Benyapa Aimsaard and Nuntakarn Aimsaard with a score of 21–16, 21–12. She was part of the South Korean team that won gold in the 2022 Uber Cup.

Achievements

BWF World Junior Championships 
Mixed doubles

Asian Junior Championships 
Mixed doubles

BWF World Tour (2 titles, 3 runners-up) 
The BWF World Tour, which was announced on 19 March 2017 and implemented in 2018, is a series of elite badminton tournaments sanctioned by the Badminton World Federation (BWF). The BWF World Tour is divided into levels of World Tour Finals, Super 1000, Super 750, Super 500, Super 300, and the BWF Tour Super 100.

Women's doubles

Mixed doubles

BWF International Challenge/Series (1 title, 1 runner-up) 
Women's doubles

Mixed doubles

  BWF International Challenge tournament
  BWF International Series tournament
  BWF Future Series tournament

References

External links 
 

2000 births
Living people
Sportspeople from Seoul
Sportspeople from South Jeolla Province
South Korean female badminton players
21st-century South Korean women